, also spelled Ofuke, refers to a type of Japanese pottery that was originally produced in Nagoya, central Japan.

History 
During the Kan'ei era (1624–44), the first lord of Owari Tokugawa Yoshinao (1601–1650) had a kiln constructed at the corner of the Ofuke enceinte (Ofukemaru) in the northern part of the grounds of Nagoya Castle. This type was called oniwa-yaki (御庭焼 literally "garden ware"). Almost every feudal lord had his own oniwa-yaki, also to have gifts made. Potters from Seto were invited to make pottery. Ofukei ware therefore has links to Seto ware. Production started around 1670 and was under the patronage of the Owari Tokugawa lords.

Production initially focused on tea caddies (cha-ire), and tea bowls. The wares that came from the castle kiln were generally produced for the lords for their own use or as gifts. The lord’s taste in ceramics was also imitated by other Owari samurai, such as Hirasawa Kurō and Masaki Sōzaburō, who made their own pieces.

Ofukei ware however was also produced at a number of Mino ware kilns. 
During the rule of the second lord Tokugawa Mitsutomo (1625–1700), the production of the kiln had stopped, but under the 10th lord Tokugawa Naritomo (1793–1850) it restarted around 1800. The production finally ceased with the end of feudalism in the Meiji era of the later half of the 19th century. 
Another pottery that was produced under the reign of the 12th lord Tokugawa Naritaka (1810–1845) was Kinjō Higashiyama ware and Hagiyama ware. 

Ofuke ware is burned with the use of feldspar minerals and shows a transparent ash glaze. Wares came in all sorts of shapes and sizes.

See also  
During the time of the production of Ofukei, in the town itself Toyoraku ware and Sasashima ware were made, mostly for tea utensils.

Other pottery from Nagoya and the wider Owari region:

 Kawana ware
 Tokoname ware
 Inuyama ware

References

External links 

 Walter Art Museum | White tenmoku tea bowl Ofuke ware
 Freer Gallery of Art and Arthur M. Sackler Gallery | Ofuke wares
 Kagedo | Ofuke ware rabbit brazier
 https://www.pref.aichi.jp/kyoiku/bunka/bunkazainavi/yukei/kougei/kensitei/0591.html

Culture in Nagoya
History of Nagoya
Japanese pottery
Nagoya Castle